Onychelus is a genus of millipedes in the family Atopetholidae. There are at least three described species in Onychelus.

Species
These three species belong to the genus Onychelus:
 Onychelus michelbacheri Verhoeff, 1938
 Onychelus obustus Cook, 1904
 Onychelus suturatus Cook, 1911

References

Further reading

 
 

Spirobolida
Articles created by Qbugbot